Edwina Cynthia Annette Mountbatten, Countess Mountbatten of Burma,  ( Ashley; 28 November 1901 – 21 February 1960), was an English heiress, socialite, relief worker and the last vicereine of India as the wife of (the then) Rear Admiral The 1st Viscount Mountbatten of Burma.

Family background and early life

Edwina Cynthia Annette Ashley was born in 1901, the elder daughter of Wilfrid Ashley (later 1st Baron Mount Temple), who was a Conservative member of Parliament. Her younger sister was Mary Ashley (Lady Delamere). Patrilineally, she was a great-granddaughter of the reformist 7th Earl of Shaftesbury. Ashley's mother, Maud Cassel (1879–1911), was the only child of the international magnate Sir Ernest Cassel (1852–1921), friend and private financier to the future King Edward VII. Cassel had been born in Cologne, Prussia, of Jewish origin.  He was one of the richest and most powerful men in Europe.

After Wilfred Ashley's remarriage in 1914 to Molly Forbes-Sempill (ex-wife of Rear-Admiral Arthur Forbes-Sempill), Edwina Ashley was sent away to boarding schools, first to the Links in Eastbourne, then to Alde House in Suffolk, at neither of which was she a willing pupil. Edwina was unhappy during the time because, in addition to a sour relationship with her stepmother, she was bullied at school on account of her grandfather being rich, German, and Jewish. She later described her experience at school as 'sheer hell'. Her grandfather, Sir Ernest, solved the domestic dilemma by inviting her to live with him and, eventually, to act as hostess at his London residence, Brook House. Later, his other mansions, Moulton Paddocks and Branksome Dene, would become part of her Cassel inheritance.

Marriage and children

By the time she first met Louis Mountbatten, a relative of the British royal family and a nephew of Empress Alexandra of Russia, in 1920, Edwina Ashley was a leading member of London society. Her maternal grandfather died in 1921, leaving her £2 million (equivalent to £ million in ), and his palatial London townhouse, Brook House, at a time when her future husband's naval salary was £610 a year (equivalent to £ in ). Later, she inherited the country seat of Broadlands, Hampshire, from her father, Lord Mount Temple.

Ashley and Mountbatten married on 18 July 1922 at St Margaret's, Westminster. The wedding attracted more than 8,000 people, including members of the royal family such as Queen Mary, Queen Alexandra, and the Prince of Wales (the future King Edward VIII). It was dubbed "wedding of the year". There followed a honeymoon tour of European royal courts and America which included a visit to Niagara Falls (because "all honeymooners went there"). During their honeymoon in California, the newlyweds starred in a silent home movie by Charlie Chaplin called Nice And Friendly, which was not shown in cinemas.

The Mountbattens had two daughters, Patricia (14 February 1924 – 13 June 2017) and Pamela (born 19 April 1929).

Drew Pearson described Edwina in 1944 as "one of the most beautiful women in England". She was known to have affairs throughout the marriage, doing little to hide them from her husband. He became aware of her lovers, accepted them and even developed friendships with some of them – making them "part of the family". Her daughter Pamela Hicks wrote a memoir in which she describes her mother as "a man eater" and her mother's many lovers as a succession of "uncles" throughout her childhood. In her memoir Pamela describes Edwina as a detached, rarely seen mother who preferred travelling the world with her current lover to mothering her children.
Edwina's affair with Jawaharlal Nehru, prime minister of India, both during and after their post-war service has been widely documented. She also reportedly had an affair with the Grenadian jazz singer Leslie Hutchinson.

Second World War
At the outbreak of the Second World War, Mountbatten acquired a new purpose. In 1941, she visited the United States, where she expressed gratitude for efforts to raise funds for the British Red Cross and St John Ambulance Brigade. In 1942, she was appointed Superintendent-in-Chief of the St John Ambulance Brigade, serving extensively. In 1945, she assisted in the repatriation of prisoners of war in the South East Asia. She was appointed a CBE in 1943 and made a Dame Commander of the Royal Victorian Order (DCVO) in 1946. She also received the American Red Cross Medal.

Vicereine of India

Edwina Mountbatten was the last vicereine of India, serving during the final months of the British Raj and the first months of the post-Partition period (February 1947 to June 1948) when Louis Mountbatten was the last viceroy of India and then, after the partition of India and Pakistan in June 1947, the governor-general of India, but not of the Dominion of Pakistan. It was at this time that a serious relationship between Edwina Mountbatten and Nehru, the new prime minister of India, began. Whether the romance was ever consummated is not known; however, their mutual fondness was evident and caused widespread speculation. In 2012, Edwina's daughter, Lady Pamela Hicks, accepted that there was a romance between her mother and Jawaharlal Nehru, which she mentioned in the book Daughter of Empire: Life As A Mountbatten. British historian Philip Ziegler, with access to the private letters and diaries, concludes the relationship:
was to endure until Edwina Mountbatten's death: intensely loving, romantic, trusting, generous, idealistic, even spiritual. If there was any physical element it can only have been of minor importance to either party. Mountbatten's reaction was one of pleasure....He liked and admired Nehru, it was useful to him that the Prime Minister should find such attractions in the Governor-General's home, it was agreeable to find Edwina almost permanently in good temper: the advantages of the alliance were obvious.

From 28 October 1947 onwards, Edwina Mountbatten was styled as the Countess Mountbatten of Burma, after her husband was elevated to an earldom. Following the violent disruption that accompanied the partition of India, Lady Mountbatten's priority was to mobilise the enormous relief efforts required, work for which she was widely praised. After her viceroyalty in India, her public service included service for the St John Ambulance Brigade. She was a governor of The Peckham Experiment in 1949.

Death
Lady Mountbatten died in her sleep aged 58 of unknown causes on 21 February 1960 in Jesselton (now Kota Kinabalu), North Borneo (now Sabah), while on an inspection tour for the St John Ambulance Brigade. In accordance with her wishes, she was buried at sea off the coast of Portsmouth from HMS Wakeful on 25 February 1960; Geoffrey Fisher, Archbishop of Canterbury, officiated. 
On learning of the news, Queen Elizabeth The Queen Mother observed, "Dear Edwina, she always liked to make a splash." Indian prime minister Jawaharlal Nehru had the Indian Navy frigate INS Trishul escort the Wakeful and cast a wreath. Her will was proven in London on 21 March 1960, with her estate valued for probate at £589,655 (equivalent to £ in ).

Honours
 Dame Commander of the Royal Victorian Order (DCVO) – 1 January 1946
 Dame Grand Cross of the Venerable Order of the Hospital of St. John of Jerusalem (GCStJ: 1 January 1946; CStJ: 19 December 1928)
 Lady of the Imperial Order of the Crown of India (CI) -21 February 1947
 Dame Grand Cross of the Order of the British Empire (GBE: 1 January 1948; CBE: 1 January 1943)
 Service Medal of the Order of St John

In popular culture
Lady Mountbatten of Burma has been portrayed by:
 Janet Suzman in the 1986 television docudrama Lord Mountbatten: The Last Viceroy 
 Maria Aitken in the 1998 biographical film Jinnah
 Gillian Anderson in Gurinder Chadha's historical drama film Viceroy's House (2017) 
 Lucy Russell in series 2 of The Crown (2017)

References

Notes

Further reading
 Morgan, Janet Edwina Mountbatten: A Life of Her Own, Scribners, 1991. 
 Ziegler, Philip, Mountbatten: the official biography, Collins, 1985. 
 Hough, Richard, Mountbatten: Hero of our time, London: Weidenfeld and Nicolson, 1980.

External links

Tribute & Memorial Website to Louis, 1st Earl Mountbatten of Burma
 

1901 births
1960 deaths
British debutantes
British countesses
Companions of the Order of the Crown of India
Dames Commander of the Royal Victorian Order
Dames Grand Cross of the Order of the British Empire
Dames Grand Cross of the Order of St John
Double dames
Daughters of barons
Edwina
Burials at sea
British people of German-Jewish descent
People from Test Valley
Edwina
Viceregal consorts of India
Wives of knights